The communauté de communes du Montreuillois was created on July 12, 1999, and was located in the Pas-de-Calais département, in northern France. It was created in January 2002. It was merged into the new Communauté d'agglomération des Deux Baies en Montreuillois in January 2017.

The Communauté de communes comprised the following communes:

Attin  
Beaumerie-Saint-Martin  
Bernieulles 
Beutin 
Campigneulles-les-Grandes  
Campigneulles-les-Petites 
Écuires  
Estrée 
Estréelles  
Hubersent 
Inxent 
La Calotterie 
La Madelaine-sous-Montreuil 
Lépine 
Montcavrel 
Montreuil-sur-Mer  
Nempont-Saint-Firmin  
Neuville-sous-Montreuil  
Recques-sur-Course 
Sorrus 
Wailly-Beaucamp

References

External links 
 Official Communauté Website

Montreuil